Darko Pahlić (born January 17, 1963 in Zadar, PR Croatia, FPR Yugoslavia) is a former Croatian basketball player. Pahlić was part of the KK Zadar team that won the 1986 Yugoslav national championship, sensationally beating the reigning European champion Cibona in the playoffs.

References

External links
Fibaeurope.com Profile

1963 births
Living people
Croatian men's basketball players
Yugoslav men's basketball players
KK Zadar players
Basketball players from Zadar